A natural satellite is, in the most common usage, an astronomical body that orbits a planet, dwarf planet, or small Solar System body (or sometimes another natural satellite). Natural satellites are often colloquially referred to as moons, a derivation from the Moon of Earth.

In the Solar System, there are six planetary satellite systems containing 226 known natural satellites altogether. Seven objects commonly considered dwarf planets by astronomers are also known to have natural satellites: , Pluto, Haumea, Makemake, and Eris. , there are 442 other minor planets known to have natural satellites.

A planet usually has at least around 10,000 times the mass of any natural satellites that orbit it, with a correspondingly much larger diameter. The next largest ratios are the Neptune–Triton system at 0.055 (with a mass ratio of about 1 to 5000), the Saturn–Titan system at 0.044 (with the second mass ratio next to the Earth–Moon system, 1 to 4250), the Jupiter–Ganymede system at 0.038, and the Uranus–Titania system at 0.031. For the category of dwarf planets, Charon has the largest ratio, being 0.52 the diameter and 12.2% the mass of Pluto.

Terminology
The first known natural satellite was the Moon, but it was considered a "planet" until Copernicus' introduction of De revolutionibus orbium coelestium in 1543. Until the discovery of the Galilean satellites in 1610 there was no opportunity for referring to such objects as a class. Galileo chose to refer to his discoveries as Planetæ ("planets"), but later discoverers chose other terms to distinguish them from the objects they orbited.

The first to use the term satellite to describe orbiting bodies was the German astronomer Johannes Kepler in his pamphlet Narratio de Observatis a se quatuor Iouis satellitibus erronibus ("Narration About Four Satellites of Jupiter Observed") in 1610. He derived the term from the Latin word satelles, meaning "guard", "attendant", or "companion", because the satellites accompanied their primary planet in their journey through the heavens.

The term satellite thus became the normal one for referring to an object orbiting a planet, as it avoided the ambiguity of "moon". In 1957, however, the launching of the artificial object Sputnik created a need for new terminology. The terms man-made satellite and artificial moon were very quickly abandoned in favor of the simpler satellite, and as a consequence, the term has become linked primarily with artificial objects flown in space.

Because of this shift in meaning, the term moon, which had continued to be used in a generic sense in works of popular science and in fiction, has regained respectability and is now used interchangeably with natural satellite, even in scientific articles. When it is necessary to avoid both the ambiguity of confusion with Earth's natural satellite the Moon and the natural satellites of the other planets on the one hand, and artificial satellites on the other, the term natural satellite (using "natural" in a sense opposed to "artificial") is used. To further avoid ambiguity, the convention is to capitalize the word Moon when referring to Earth's natural satellite (a proper noun), but not when referring to other natural satellites (common nouns).

Many authors define "satellite" or "natural satellite" as orbiting some planet or minor planet, synonymous with "moon" – by such a definition all natural satellites are moons, but Earth and other planets are not satellites.
A few recent authors define "moon" as "a satellite of a planet or minor planet", and "planet" as "a satellite of a star" – such authors consider Earth as a "natural satellite of the Sun".

Definition of a moon 

There is no established lower limit on what is considered a "moon". Every natural celestial body with an identified orbit around a planet of the Solar System, some as small as a kilometer across, has been considered a moon, though objects a tenth that size within Saturn's rings, which have not been directly observed, have been called moonlets. Small asteroid moons (natural satellites of asteroids), such as Dactyl, have also been called moonlets.

The upper limit is also vague. Two orbiting bodies are sometimes described as a double planet rather than primary and satellite. Asteroids such as 90 Antiope are considered double asteroids, but they have not forced a clear definition of what constitutes a moon. Some authors consider the Pluto–Charon system to be a double (dwarf) planet. The most common dividing line on what is considered a moon rests upon whether the barycentre is below the surface of the larger body, though this is somewhat arbitrary, because it depends on distance as well as relative mass.

Origin and orbital characteristics 

The natural satellites orbiting relatively close to the planet on prograde, uninclined circular orbits (regular satellites) are generally thought to have been formed out of the same collapsing region of the protoplanetary disk that created its primary. In contrast, irregular satellites (generally orbiting on distant, inclined, eccentric and/or retrograde orbits) are thought to be captured asteroids possibly further fragmented by collisions. Most of the major natural satellites of the Solar System have regular orbits, while most of the small natural satellites have irregular orbits. The Moon and possibly Charon are exceptions among large bodies in that they are thought to have originated from the collision of two large proto-planetary objects (see the giant impact hypothesis). The material that would have been placed in orbit around the central body is predicted to have reaccreted to form one or more orbiting natural satellites. As opposed to planetary-sized bodies, asteroid moons are thought to commonly form by this process. Triton is another exception; although large and in a close, circular orbit, its motion is retrograde and it is thought to be a captured dwarf planet.

Temporary satellites 

The capture of an asteroid from a heliocentric orbit is not always permanent. According to simulations, temporary satellites should be a common phenomenon.

 was a temporary satellite of Earth for nine months in 2006 and 2007.

Tidal locking 

Most regular moons (natural satellites following relatively close and prograde orbits with small orbital inclination and eccentricity) in the Solar System are tidally locked to their respective primaries, meaning that the same side of the natural satellite always faces its planet. This phenomenon comes about through a loss of energy due to tidal forces raised by the planet, slowing the rotation of the satellite until it is negligible. The only known exception is Saturn's natural satellite Hyperion, which rotates chaotically because of the gravitational influence of Titan.

In contrast, the outer natural satellites of the giant planets (irregular satellites) are too far away to have become locked. For example, Jupiter's Himalia, Saturn's Phoebe, and Neptune's Nereid have rotation periods in the range of ten hours, whereas their orbital periods are hundreds of days.

Satellites of satellites 

No "moons of moons" or subsatellites (natural satellites that orbit a natural satellite of a planet) are currently known. In most cases, the tidal effects of the planet would make such a system unstable.

However, calculations performed after the 2008 detection of a possible ring system around Saturn's moon Rhea indicate that satellites orbiting Rhea could have stable orbits. Furthermore, the suspected rings are thought to be narrow, a phenomenon normally associated with shepherd moons. However, targeted images taken by the Cassini spacecraft failed to detect rings around Rhea.

It has also been proposed that Saturn's moon Iapetus had a satellite in the past; this is one of several hypotheses that have been put forward to account for its equatorial ridge.

Light-curve analysis suggests that Saturn's irregular satellite Kiviuq is extremely prolate, and is likely a contact binary or even a binary moon.

Trojan satellites 

Two natural satellites are known to have small companions at both their  and  Lagrangian points, sixty degrees ahead and behind the body in its orbit. These companions are called trojan moons, as their orbits are analogous to the trojan asteroids of Jupiter. The trojan moons are Telesto and Calypso, which are the leading and following companions, respectively, of the Saturnian moon Tethys; and Helene and Polydeuces, the leading and following companions of the Saturnian moon Dione.

Asteroid satellites 

The discovery of 243 Ida's natural satellite Dactyl in the early 1990s confirmed that some asteroids have natural satellites; indeed, 87 Sylvia has two. Some, such as 90 Antiope, are double asteroids with two comparably sized components.

Shape 

Neptune's moon Proteus is the largest irregularly shaped natural satellite; the shapes of Eris' moon Dysnomia and Orcus' moon Vanth are unknown. All other known natural satellites that are at least the size of Uranus's Miranda have lapsed into rounded ellipsoids under hydrostatic equilibrium, i.e. are "round/rounded satellites" and are sometimes categorized as planetary-mass moons. (Dysnomia's density is known to be high enough that it is probably a solid ellipsoid as well.) The larger natural satellites, being tidally locked, tend toward ovoid (egg-like) shapes: squat at their poles and with longer equatorial axes in the direction of their primaries (their planets) than in the direction of their motion. Saturn's moon Mimas, for example, has a major axis 9% greater than its polar axis and 5% greater than its other equatorial axis. Methone, another of Saturn's moons, is only around 3 km in diameter and visibly egg-shaped. The effect is smaller on the largest natural satellites, where their own gravity is greater relative to the effects of tidal distortion, especially those that orbit less massive planets or, as in the case of the Moon, at greater distances.

Geological activity

Of the twenty known natural satellites in the Solar System that are large enough to be gravitationally rounded, several remain geologically active today. Io is the most volcanically active body in the Solar System, while Europa, Enceladus, Titan and Triton display evidence of ongoing tectonic activity and cryovolcanism. In the first three cases, the geological activity is powered by the tidal heating resulting from having eccentric orbits close to their giant-planet primaries. (This mechanism would have also operated on Triton in the past, before its orbit was circularized.) Many other natural satellites, such as Earth's Moon, Ganymede, Tethys and Miranda, show evidence of past geological activity, resulting from energy sources such as the decay of their primordial radioisotopes, greater past orbital eccentricities (due in some cases to past orbital resonances), or the differentiation or freezing of their interiors. Enceladus and Triton both have active features resembling geysers, although in the case of Triton solar heating appears to provide the energy. Titan and Triton have significant atmospheres; Titan also has hydrocarbon lakes. Also Io and Callisto have atmospheres, even if they are extremely thin. Four of the largest natural satellites, Europa, Ganymede, Callisto, and Titan, are thought to have subsurface oceans of liquid water, while smaller Enceladus may have localized subsurface liquid water.

Occurrence in the Solar System 

Besides planets and dwarf planets objects within our Solar System known to have natural satellites are 76 in the asteroid belt (five with two each), four Jupiter trojans, 39 near-Earth objects (two with two satellites each), and 14 Mars-crossers. There are also 84 known natural satellites of trans-Neptunian objects. Some 150 additional small bodies have been observed within the rings of Saturn, but only a few were tracked long enough to establish orbits. Planets around other stars are likely to have satellites as well, and although numerous candidates have been detected to date, none have yet been confirmed.

Of the inner planets, Mercury and Venus have no natural satellites; Earth has one large natural satellite, known as the Moon; and Mars has two tiny natural satellites, Phobos and Deimos.
The giant planets have extensive systems of natural satellites, including half a dozen comparable in size to Earth's Moon: the four Galilean moons, Saturn's Titan, and Neptune's Triton. Saturn has an additional six mid-sized natural satellites massive enough to have achieved hydrostatic equilibrium, and Uranus has five. It has been suggested that some satellites may potentially harbour life.

Among the objects generally agreed by astronomers to be dwarf planets, Ceres and  have no known natural satellites. Pluto has the relatively large natural satellite Charon and four smaller natural satellites; Styx, Nix, Kerberos, and Hydra. The Pluto–Charon system is unusual in that the center of mass lies in open space between the two, a characteristic sometimes associated with a double-planet system.

The seven largest natural satellites in the Solar System (those bigger than 2,500 km across) are Jupiter's Galilean moons (Ganymede, Callisto, Io, and Europa), Saturn's moon Titan, Earth's moon, and Neptune's captured natural satellite Triton. Triton, the smallest of these, has more mass than all smaller natural satellites together. Similarly in the next size group of nine mid-sized natural satellites, between 1,000 km and 1,600 km across, Titania, Oberon, Rhea, Iapetus, Charon, Ariel, Umbriel, Dione, and Tethys, the smallest, Tethys, has more mass than all smaller natural satellites together. As well as the natural satellites of the various planets, there are also over 80 known natural satellites of the dwarf planets, minor planets and other small Solar System bodies. Some studies estimate that up to 15% of all trans-Neptunian objects could have satellites.

The following is a comparative table classifying the natural satellites in the Solar System by diameter. The column on the right includes some notable planets, dwarf planets, asteroids, and trans-Neptunian objects for comparison. The natural satellites of the planets are named after mythological figures. These are predominantly Greek, except for the Uranian natural satellites, which are named after Shakespearean characters. The twenty satellites massive enough to be round are in bold in the table below. Minor planets and satellites where there is disagreement in the literature on roundness are italicized in the table below.

Visual summary

See also

Moons of planets

Moons of dwarf planets and small Solar System bodies

References

External links

All moons
 Natural Satellite Physical Parameters (JPL-NASA, with refs – last updated July 2006)
 Moons of the Solar System (The Planetary Society, as of March 2009)
 The JPL's Solar System Dynamics page
 
 Planetary Names: Planet and Satellite Names and Discoverers
 "Upper size limit for moons explained" Kelly Young. Nature (vol 441, p. 834) 14 June 2006
 Images of planets and major moons (not to scale)
 The Planetary Society – Moon Montage(s)
 Album of moon images by Kevin M. Gill
 The Atlas of Moons by the National Geographic Society

Jupiter's moons
 
 Outer Satellites Discovered Around Jupiter in 2002 Scott S. Sheppard
 New Satellites of Jupiter Discovered in 2003 Scott S. Sheppard

Saturn's moons
 Satellite-hunters find four new moons of the planet Saturn David Brand | 26 October 2000
 Saturn's New Satellite S/2003 S1 Scott S. Sheppard